William Balloch Stirling Naughton (born 20 March 1962) is a Scottish former professional footballer who played in the Football League as a left winger.

References

1962 births
Living people
Footballers from East Ayrshire
Scottish footballers
Association football wingers
Preston North End F.C. players
Walsall F.C. players
Shrewsbury Town F.C. players
Chorley F.C. players
Bamber Bridge F.C. players
English Football League players